This page lists orchid species according to their respective distribution range.

Africa only
Agrostophyllum occidentale (Seychelles, N. Madagascar)
Agrostophyllum seychellarum (Seychelles)
Ancistrochilus rothschildianus (W. Trop. Africa to Uganda)
Ancistrochilus thomsonianus (S. Nigeria to WC. Trop. Africa)

China only, including Taiwan and Hainan

Northeast China only
Cypripedium agnicapitatum (Manchuria)
Cypripedium morinanthum (Manchuria)
Cypripedium neoparviflorum (Manchuria)
Cypripedium roseum (Manchuria)
Cypripedium sinapoides (Manchuria)

Tibet, Southwest, South-Central China only

Taiwan only
Cypripedium formosanum (C Taiwan)
Cypripedium segawai (EC Taiwan)

China through Korea, Japan
Cypripedium debile (Japan, Taiwan, China)
Cypripedium japonicum (China, Korea, Japan)
Cypripedium shanxiense (China to N Japan)

China through Southeast Asia
Cypripedium lichiangense (China (SW Sichuan, NW Yunnan), NE Myanmar)
Cypripedium plectrochilum (N Myanmar to SC China)
Paphiopedilum appletonianum (Indochina to Hainan)
Paphiopedilum armeniacum (western Yunnan to northern Myanmar)
Paphiopedilum bellatulum (Southeast Yunnan, Guizhou, South Guangxi to Indochina)
Paphiopedilum charlesworthii (N. Myanmar to China - Yunnan)
Paphiopedilum concolor (China - YunNan, Guizhou, Guangxi to Indo-China)
Paphiopedilum hangianum (China - YunNan to Viet Nam)
Paphiopedilum henryanum (China - SE. YunNan, Guangxi to N. Vietnam)
Paphiopedilum hirsutissimum var. esquirolei (China - YunNan, Guizhou, Guangxi to N. & E. Indo-China)
Paphiopedilum malipoense (S. China to N. Viet Nam)
Paphiopedilum malipoense var. jackii (H.S.Hua) Aver. (SE Yunnan to N. Vietnam)
Paphiopedilum malipoense var. malipoense (China - SE. YunNan, SW. Guizhou, SW. Guangxi to N. Viet Nam)
Paphiopedilum micranthum (China - SE. YunNan, W. & N. Guangxi, W. Guizhou to N. Viet Nam)
Paphiopedilum wardii (China - SW. YunNan to Myanmar)
Paphiopedilum villosum var. annamense (Yunnan, Guangxi to Indo-China)
Pleione albiflora (China - W. Yunnan to N. Myanmar)
Pleione forrestii (China - NW. Yunnan)- to N. Myanmar)
Pleione grandiflora (China (- S. Yunnan to NW. Vietnam)
Pleione yunnanensis (SC. China to N. Myanmar)

Himalaya endemic
Agrostophyllum flavidum (Assam)
Agrostophyllum myrianthum (Sikkim, Arunachal Pradesh)
Paphiopedilum insigne (Assam - Meghalaya)
Paphiopedilum venustum (E. Nepal to NE. Bangladesh)
Pleione coronaria (C. Nepal)

Southern India, Sri Lanka endemic
Adrorhizon purpurascens (South India and Sri Lanka)
Paphiopedilum druryi (S. India)
Agrostophyllum zeylanicum (Sri Lanka)

South Asia through Himalaya through China, including Hainan
Agrostophyllum callosum (Nepal to Hainan)
Cypripedium cordigerum (N Pakistan to Himalaya, S Tibet)
Cypripedium elegans (E Nepal to China) 
Cypripedium himalaicum (SE Tibet to Himalaya)
Cypripedium tibeticum (Sikkim to C China)
Paphiopedilum fairrieanum (E. Himalaya to Assam)
Paphiopedilum hirsutissimum (Assam to S. China)
Paphiopedilum parishii (Assam to China - W. YunNan)
Paphiopedilum villosum (Assam to S. China)
Pleione maculata (C. Himalaya to China - W. Yunnan)
Pleione praecox (WC. Himalaya to China - S. Yunnan)
Pleione saxicola (E. Bhutan to China - NW. Yunnan)
Pleione scopulorum (India - NE. Arunachal Pradesh to China - NW. Yunnan)

South Asia through Himalaya to Southeast Asia, possibly Pacific Islands
 Acanthephippium bicolor (S. India, Sri Lanka, New Guinea)
 Acanthephippium striatum (E. Himalaya to Java)
Acanthephippium sylhetense (Sikkim to Philippines)
Agrostophyllum brevipes (E. Himalaya to Indo-China)
Agrostophyllum planicaule (Himalaya to Indo-China) 
Arundina graminifolia (India, Nepal, Thailand, Malaysia, Singapore, South China to Indonesia and across the Pacific Islands)
Paphiopedilum hirsutissimum var. hirsutissimum (Assam to Myanmar)
Paphiopedilum spicerianum (Bhutan to NW. Myanmar)
Paphiopedilum villosum var. villosum (Assam to Thailand)
Pleione hookeriana (Nepal to China - SE. Yunnan to N. Guangdong-  to Indo-China)
Pleione humilis (C. Himalaya to Myanmar)

Southeast Asia only
 Acanthephippium gougahensis (Thailand, Vietnam)
 Acanthephippium parviflorum (Vietnam, S. Sumatra to Java)
 Agrostophyllum longifolium (Pen. Thailand to Malaysia)
 Dendrochilum pallidiflavens (Myanmar, Thailand, Malaysia, Philippines, Borneo, Java, Sumatra, Lesser Sunda Islands)
 Dendrochilum pallidiflavens var. pallidiflavens (Myanmar, Thailand, Malaysia, Philippines, Borneo, Java, Sumatra, Lesser Sunda Islands)
Paphiopedilum barbatum (Pen. Thailand to Sumatra)
Paphiopedilum callosum (Indo-China to NW. Pen. Malaysia)
Paphiopedilum callosum var. callosum (Indo-China)
Paphiopedilum callosum var. warnerianum (Pen. Thailand to NW. Pen. Malaysia)
Paphiopedilum dixlerianum (Myanmar)
Paphiopedilum gratrixianum (Laos to Viet Nam)
Paphiopedilum niveum (Pen. Thailand to N. Pen. Malaysia)
Paphiopedilum philippinense (Philippines to N. Borneo)
Paphiopedilum philippinense var. philippinense (Philippines to N. Borneo)
Paphiopedilum rhizomatosum (Myanmar)
Paphiopedilum villosum var. boxallii (Myanmar)

Continental Malaysia only
Agrostophyllum cyathiforme (W. Malaysia)
Agrostophyllum glumaceum (W. Malaysia)
Agrostophyllum javanicum (W. Malesia)
Agrostophyllum laxum (W. Malaysia)
Agrostophyllum stipulatum subsp. bicuspidatum (W. Malaysia)
Agrostophyllum tenue (W. Malaysia)
Dendrochilum carnosum (Malaysia)
Dendrochilum coccineum (Malaysia)
 Dendrochilum gracile (Malaysia)
 Dendrochilum gracile var. gracile (Malaysia)
 Dendrochilum gramineum (Malaysia)
Paphiopedilum bullenianum (Malaysia)
Paphiopedilum bullenianum var. bullenianum (W. Malaysia)
Paphiopedilum lowii (W. & C. Malesia)
Paphiopedilum lowii var. lowii (W. & C. Malaysia)

Indonesia only, including whole of Borneo
 Dendrochilum galeatum H.A.Pedersen 1995 publ. 1996 (Lesser Sunda Islands)
Paphiopedilum javanicum (Sumatra to Lesser Sunda Is.)
Paphiopedilum javanicum var. javanicum (Sumatra to Lesser Sunda Is.)
Paphiopedilum liemianum (N. Sumatra)
Paphiopedilum mastersianum (Lesser Sunda Is. to Maluku)
Paphiopedilum mastersianum var. mastersianum (Maluku - Ambon, Buru) 
Paphiopedilum mastersianum var. mohrianum (Lesser Sunda Is. (Flores)

Borneo only

Java endemic
Agrostophyllum latilobum ( W. & C. Java)
Dendrochilum abbreviatum (Java)
 Dendrochilum abbreviatum var. abbreviatum (Java)
 Dendrochilum abbreviatum var. remiforme (Java)
 Dendrochilum brachyotum (Java)
 Dendrochilum edentulum var. edentulum (Java)
 Dendrochilum oxyglossum (Java)
 Dendrochilum spathaceum (Java)
 Dendrochilum zollingeri (Java)
Paphiopedilum glaucophyllum (E. Java)
Paphiopedilum glaucophyllum var. glaucophyllum (E. Java) 
Paphiopedilum glaucophyllum var. moquetteanum  (SW. Java)

Sulawesi endemics, Malukus endemics, and species endemic to both
Agrostophyllum amboinense (Maluku  - Ambon)
Agrostophyllum atrovirens (Maluku - Ambon)
Agrostophyllum simile (Sulawesi)
Agrostophyllum vanhulstijnii (Maluku)
Dendrochilum ambangense (Sulawesi)
Dendrochilum celebesense (Sulawesi)
Dendrochilum citrinum (Sulawesi)
Dendrochilum edentulum var. patentibracteatum (Sulawesi)
Dendrochilum erectilabium (Sulawesi)
Dendrochilum eymae (Sulawesi)
 Dendrochilum heptaphyllum (Sulawesi)
 Dendrochilum latibrachiatum (Sulawesi)
 Dendrochilum longipedicellatum (Sulawesi)
 Dendrochilum macropterum (Sulawesi)
 Dendrochilum monodii (Sulawesi) 
 Dendrochilum muriculatum (Sulawesi)
 Dendrochilum simplicissimum (Sulawesi)
 Dendrochilum tenuissimum (Sulawesi)
Paphiopedilum bullenianum var. celebesense (Sulawesi to Maluku)
Paphiopedilum gigantifolium (SC. Sulawesi)
Paphiopedilum intaniae (Sulawesi)
Paphiopedilum lowii var. richardianum (Sulawesi)
Paphiopedilum sangii (N. Sulawesi)
Paphiopedilum schoseri (Sulawesi to Maluku)

Sumatra only

Species native to more than one of the following: Western Malaysia, Sumatra, Java, Borneo, Sulawesi, New Guinea, the Philippines and Taiwan
Acanthephippium javanicum (W. Malaysia, Borneo, Java, Sumatra, New Guinea)
Acanthephippium splendidum (Sulawesi to SW. Pacific, New Guinea)
Agrostophyllum denbergeri (Sumatra to Java)
Agrostophyllum inocephalum (S. Taiwan to Philippines)
Agrostophyllum mearnsii (N. Borneo to Philippines)
Agrostophyllum sumatranum (W. Sumatra, Borneo)
Agrostophyllum trifidum (Sumatra, Borneo)
 Dendrochilum angustifolium (Malaysia, Sumatra)
 Dendrochilum aurantiacum (Sumatra, Java)
 Dendrochilum crassum (Malaysia, Borneo)
Dendrochilum cornutum (Java, Sumatra)
 Dendrochilum dewindtianum (Sumatra, Borneo)
 Dendrochilum edentulum (Java, Sulawesi)
 Dendrochilum exalatum (Sumatra, Java)
Dendrochilum glumaceum (Philippines, Borneo)
 Dendrochilum kingii (Malaysia, Borneo to Philippines)
 Dendrochilum kingii var. kingii (Malaysia, Borneo to Philippines)
 Dendrochilum longifolium (Indonesia, Malaysia, Borneo, Philippines, New Guinea)
 Dendrochilum linearifolium (Malaysia, Sumatra)
 Dendrochilum odoratum (Malaysia, Sumatra)
 Dendrochilum simile (Sumatra, Java, Malaysia, Lesser Sunda Islands)
 Dendrochilum uncatum' (Philippines, Taiwan)
 Dendrochilum uncatum var. uncatum(Philippines, Taiwan)
 Dendrochilum vaginatum J.J.Sm. 1904 (Sumatra, Java)

Philippines only

Thailand only
 Dendrochilum viride (Thailand)
Paphiopedilum callosum var. potentianum
Paphiopedilum exul (Pen. Thailand)
Paphiopedilum godefroyae (Pen. Thailand)
Paphiopedilum sukhakulii (NE. Thailand)
Paphiopedilum thaianum
Paphiopedilum vejvarutianum (Kanchanaburi)

Vietnam only
Paphiopedilum delenatii (SE. Viet Nam) 
Paphiopedilum helenae (N. Vietnam - Cao Bang Prov)
Paphiopedilum tranlienianum (Viet Nam).
Paphiopedilum tranlienianum f. alboviride (Viet Nam)
Paphiopedilum vietnamense (Viet Nam)
Pleione vietnamensis (SC. Vietnam)

Southeast Asia through New Guinea and Pacific Islands
Agrostophyllum elongatum (Malaysia to W. Pacific)
Agrostophyllum majus (Pen. Thailand to Vanuatu)
Agrostophyllum stipulatum (Indo-China, Malaysia to Solomon Is.) 
Agrostophyllum parviflorum (Maluku to New Guinea)
Agrostophyllum stipulatum subsp. stipulatum (Indo-China, Malaysia to Solomon Is.)

Europe through Asia
Cypripedium calceolus (Europe to Japan)
Cypripedium macranthum (E Belarus to temperate E Asia)

New Guinea and adjacent islands only

New Guinea through Pacific Islands
Agrostophyllum curvilabre (New Guinea to Solomon Is.)
Agrostophyllum graminifolium (New Guinea to Vanuatu)
Agrostophyllum leucocephalum (New Guinea to SW. Pacific)
Agrostophyllum megalurum (New Guinea to W. Pacific)
Agrostophyllum paniculatum ( New Guinea to Solomon Is.)
Agrostophyllum superpositum (New Guinea to Solomon Is.)
Agrostophyllum torricellense (New Guinea to S. Vanuatu)

Pacific Islands endemic
Agrostophyllum aristatum (Fiji)
Agrostophyllum kusaiense (Caroline Is.)
Agrostophyllum palawense (Caroline Is. - Palau)
Earina aestivalis (New Zealand)
Earina autumnalis (New Zealand)
Earina mucronata (New Zealand)
Paphiopedilum bougainvilleanum (Solomon Islands)
Paphiopedilum bougainvilleanum var. bougainvilleanum (North Solomons)
Paphiopedilum bougainvilleanum var. saskianum (South Solomons)
Paphiopedilum wentworthianum (Solomon Is.)

North America only
Arethusa bulbosa (Eastern Canada, Eastern North America)
Cypripedium acaule (C. and E. Canada, NC & E U.S.A)
Cypripedium × andrewsii (C. candidum × C. parviflorum var. pubescens) (E Canada, NC & NE U.S.A)
Cypripedium arietinum (C & E Canada, NC & NE U.S.A)
Cypripedium candidum (SE Canada, NC & E U.S.A)
Cypripedium × columbianum (W Canada, NW U.S.A)
Cypripedium fasciculatum (W U.S.A)
Cypripedium kentuckiense (C & E U.S.A)
Cypripedium parviflorum (Canada, E U.S.A). 
Cypripedium parviflorum var. parviflorum (Canada, E U.S.A.)
Cypripedium parviflorum var. pubescens (N. America)
Cypripedium passerinum (Alaska to Canada, Montana)
Cypripedium reginae (C & E Canada, NC & E. U.S.A)

Pacific Coast only
Cypripedium × alaskanum (Alaska)
Cypripedium californicum (Oregon, N. California)
Cypripedium montanum (Alaska to California)

Canadian Prairies only
Cypripedium x herae (Manitoba, Canada)

Mexico endemics
Alamania punicea (Mexico)
Artorima erubescens (Mexico)
Burnsbaloghia diaphana (Mexico)
Cypripedium molle (Mexico)
Dithyridanthus densiflorus (Mexico)
Hintonella mexicana (Mexico)
Mexicoa ghiesbreghtiana (Mexico)
Papperitzia leiboldii (Mexico)
Pseudocranichis thysanochila (Mexico)

Mexico through Central and South America endemics
Brassavola cucullata (Mexico to N. South America)
Brassavola nodosa (Mexico to Trop. America: Belize)
Brassavola venosa (SE. Mexico to C. America)
Cypripedium dickinsonianum (Mexico (S Chiapas) to Guatemala)
Cypripedium irapeanum (Mexico to Honduras)
Mexipedium xerophyticum (Oaxaca, Mexico)
Phragmipedium exstaminodium (Mexico - Chiapas to Guatemala)

Central America and Caribbean Islands
Brassavola acaulis (C. America: Belize)
Brassavola subulifolia (Jamaica)
Brassavola gillettei (Trinidad)
Brassavola harrisii (Jamaica)
Cattleya dowiana (Costa Rica)
Phragmipedium popowii (Costa Rica to Panama)

Central America and Caribbean Islands through South America
Brassavola grandiflora (C. America to Colombia)
Cattleya aurea (S. Panama to Colombia)
Cattleya gaskelliana (Colombia to Trinidad)
Phragmipedium longifolium (Costa Rica to Ecuador)

Pantropical South America endemics
includes all tropical regions in South America:
Brassavola martiana (S. Trop. America)

Andes endemics
includes portions of countries along the Andean cordillera: Ecuador, Peru, Argentina, Bolivia.
Cattleya iricolor (Ecuador to Peru)

Northern South America endemics
spans several of these entities: Venezuela, Guyana, French Guiana, and northern parts of Brazil, Peru, and Argentina.
Brassavola gardneri (French Guiana, Brazil)
Brassavola retusa (Venezuela, N. Brazil to Peru)
Brassavola tuberculata (Brazil to Peru and NE. Argentina)
Cattleya jenmanii (Venezuela to Guyana)
Cattleya lawrenceana (Venezuela, Guyana, N. Brazil)
Cattleya lueddemanniana (N. Venezuela)
Phragmipedium klotzschianum (SE. Venezuela to Guyana and N. Brazil)
Phragmipedium lindenii (Venezuela to Ecuador)
Phragmipedium lindleyanum (N. South America to Brazil - Pernambuco)
Phragmipedium tetzlaffianum (Venezuela)
 Selenipedium steyermarkii (Brazil, Venezuela)

Southern South America endemics
spans several of these entities: southern Brazil, and the countries Paraguay and Uruguay.
Cattleya intermedia (SE. & S. Brazil, Paraguay, Uruguay)
Cattleya loddigesii (SE. Brazil to NE. Argentina)
Cattleya loddigesii subsp. loddigesii (SE. Brazil to NE. Argentina)

Bolivia only
Phragmipedium caricinum (Bolivia)

Brazil endemics
Brassavola duckeana (Brazil)
Brassavola fasciculata (Brazil)
Brassavola flagellaris (Brazil)
Brassavola fragans (Brazil)
Brassavola reginae (Brazil)
Brassavola revoluta (Brazil)
Brassavola rhomboglossa (WC. & S. Brazil)
Cattleya aclandiae (Brazil) 
Cattleya amethystoglossa (Brazil)
Cattleya bicolor (SE. Brazil)
Cattleya bicolor subsp. bicolor (Brazil)
Cattleya bicolor subsp. canastrensis (Brazil)
Cattleya bicolor  subsp. minasgeraiensis (Brazil)
Cattleya dormaniana (Brazil)  
Cattleya elongata (Brazil)
Cattleya forbesii (Brazil) 
Cattleya granulosa (Brazil) 
Cattleya guttata (Brazil). 
Cattleya harrisoniana (SE. Brazil). 
Cattleya kerrii (Brazil).
Cattleya labiata (Brazil) 
Cattleya loddigesii subsp. purpurea (Brazil)
Cattleya porphyroglossa (Brazil).
Cattleya schilleriana (Brazil).
Cattleya schofieldiana (Brazil) 
Cattleya tenuis (NE. Brazil).
Cattleya tigrina (SE. & S. Brazil)
Cattleya velutina (Brazil)
Cattleya walkeriana (WC. & SE. Brazil)
Cattleya wallisii (N. Brazil)
Cattleya warneri (E. Brazil)
Phragmipedium brasiliense
Phragmipedium chapadense
Phragmipedium vittatum (WC. & SE. Brazil)
Selenipedium isabelianum
Selenipedium palmifolium
Selenipedium vanillocarpum

Colombia endemics
Brassavola filifolia (Colombia)
Cattleya candida (Colombia) 
Cattleya mendelii (NE. Colombia)
Cattleya schroderae (NE. Colombia)
Cattleya trianae (Colombia)
Cattleya warscewiczii (Colombia)
Phragmipedium schlimii

Colombia through Ecuador
Phragmipedium warszewiczianum

Ecuador only
Phragmipedium andreettae
Phragmipedium besseae var. dalessandroi (S. Ecuador)
Phragmipedium fischeri
Phragmipedium hirtzii (N. Ecuador)
Phragmipedium × roethianum
Selenipedium aequinoctiale

Ecuador through Peru
Phragmipedium besseae (Ecuador to N. Peru)
Phragmipedium besseae var. besseae (E. Ecuador to N. Peru)
Phragmipedium boissierianum (S. Ecuador to Peru)
Phragmipedium boissierianum var. czerwiakowianum (S. Ecuador to Peru)
Phragmipedium pearcei (Ecuador to N. Peru)
Phragmipedium reticulatum

Peru endemics
Cattleya mooreana (Peru)
Phragmipedium boissierianum var. boissierianum
Phragmipedium kovachii (Peru – San Martin)
Phragmipedium richteri

Other South America endemics
spans several South American countries and does not fit in any of the above:
Cattleya luteola (N. Brazil, Ecuador to Bolivia)
Cattleya maxima (Venezuela to Peru)

Siberia only, or through Korea, Japan, and Alaska, or circumpolar
Calypso bulbosa (circumpolar)
Cypripedium × catherinae (Russian Far East)
Cypripedium guttatum (European Russia to Korea, Alaska to Yukon)
Cypripedium × ventricosum (Russia to Korea)
Cypripedium yatabeanum (Russian Far East to N & NC Japan, Aleutian Islands to SW Alaska)

References 

 Distribution
Orchid